Veena Devi (born 5 November 1976) is an Indian politician from the Lok Janshakti Party. She has served as the Member of parliament of the 16th Lok Sabha for Munger constituency in Bihar. Her husband is the criminal-turned-politician Surajbhan Singh. Her son Ashutosh, died in a car accident in 2018.

References

External links
Veena Devi at India.gov.in

1976 births
People from Begusarai district
India MPs 2014–2019
Women members of the Lok Sabha
Women in Bihar politics
21st-century Indian women politicians
21st-century Indian politicians
Lok Sabha members from Bihar
Lok Janshakti Party politicians
Living people